Hawarden is a city in Sioux County, Iowa, United States. The population was 2,700 at the time of the 2020 census. It is located on the Big Sioux River.

History
Hawarden was platted in 1882. It was named for Hawarden Castle, the Welsh home of statesman William Gladstone. Hawarden was incorporated as a city on March 18, 1887.

Geography
Hawarden is located at  (43.001145, -96.484541), along the Big Sioux River.

Climate
Hawarden is located very near to the center of the North American continent, far removed from any major bodies of water. This lends the area a humid continental climate, with hot, humid summers, cold snowy winters, and wide temperature extremes. Summers can bring daytime temperatures that climb into the 90s Fahrenheit, and winter lows can be well below zero.

Demographics

2010 census
As of the census of 2010, there were 2,546 people, 1,020 households, and 667 families living in the city. The racial makeup of the city was 86.8% White, 0.5% African American, 0.9% Native American, 0.3% Asian, 10.6% from other races, and 0.9% from two or more races. Hispanic or Latino of any race were 20.0% of the population.

There were 1,020 households, of which 29.7% had children under the age of 18 living with them, 53.1% were married couples living together, 7.6% had a female householder with no husband present, 4.6% had a male householder with no wife present, and 34.6% were non-families. 31.8% of all households were made up of individuals, and 16.6% had someone living alone who was 65 years of age or older. The average household size was 2.45 and the average family size was 3.06.

The median age in the city was 39 years. 25.4% of residents were under the age of 18; 8% were between the ages of 18 and 24; 22.9% were from 25 to 44; 23.6% were from 45 to 64; and 20.2% were 65 years of age or older. The gender makeup of the city was 49.2% male and 50.8% female.

2000 census
As of the census of 2000, there were 2,478 people, 1,032 households, and 664 families living in the city. The racial makeup of the city was 93.83% White, 0.32% African American, 0.56% Native American, 0.28% Asian, 3.67% from other races, and 1.33% from two or more races. Hispanic or Latino of any race were 6.38% of the population.

There were 1,032 households, out of which 28.6% had children under the age of 18 living with them, 54.1% were married couples living together, 7.5% had a female householder with no husband present, and 35.6% were non-families. 31.2% of all households were made up of individuals, and 17.1% had someone living alone who was 65 years of age or older. The average household size was 2.34 and the average family size was 2.93.

24.5% are under the age of 18, 7.7% from 18 to 24, 24.1% from 25 to 44, 22.5% from 45 to 64, and 21.2% who were 65 years of age or older. The median age was 40 years. For every 100 females, there were 89.6 males. For every 100 females age 18 and over, there were 86.8 males.

The median income for a household in the city was $34,360, and the median income for a family was $44,938. Males had a median income of $30,466 versus $19,669 for females. The per capita income for the city was $17,459. About 4.2% of families and 6.6% of the population were below the poverty line, including 8.1% of those under age 18 and 6.2% of those age 65 or over.

Economy
Coilcraft, Inc., which is a supplier of magnetic components including RF chip inductors, power magnetics and filters. Coilcraft’s Hawarden location focuses on product research and development, production and distribution. Other local factories include Dakota Treats, LLC a manufacturer of dog treats, For-Most, Inc. a manufacturer of cattle handling equipment, and Plasticology, LLC a plastic injection molding facility. Other large employers are Hawarden Regional Healthcare, Cooperative Farmers Elevator (CFE), Peoples Bank & Agency and Rivers Edge Bank. There are two K-12 schools in the city, West Sioux Elementary and West Sioux High/Middle School.

Education
Ireton, Hawarden, Chatsworth, and surrounding rural areas formed the West Sioux Community School District in the fall of 1959.

Arts and culture

Annual events
The city hosts "Big Sioux River Days" over Labor Day Weekend.

Notable people

 J. Hyatt Downing, writer
 Hope Emerson, actress 
 Adam Gregg, Current Lieutenant Governor of Iowa
 Stanley L. Greigg, member of the U.S. House of Representatives
 Brian Hansen, former American football punter in the National Football League 
 Vince Jasper, former American football offensive lineman in the National Football League
 Lisa Suhair Majaj, Palestinian American poet and scholar
 Albert J. Meyer, economist
 Dick Sadler, politician
 Ruth Suckow, author
 Anna Johnson Pell Wheeler, mathematician

See also

Hawarden was formerly the home of a junior college, Sioux Empire College, which closed in the 1980s.

Hawarden annexed the incorporated town of Calliope in 1893.

References

External links

City website Portal style website, Government, Business, Library, and more
City-Data Comprehensive Statistical Data and more about Hawarden

Cities in Iowa
Cities in Sioux County, Iowa
Populated places established in 1887
1887 establishments in Iowa